Sputnik Engineering AG was a Swiss company specializing in the development, production, distribution, and maintenance of grid-connected photovoltaic inverters. The headquarters of the company are located in Switzerland (Biel/Bienne). Sputnik Engineering has subsidiaries in Germany, Spain, Italy, France, Belgium, United Kingdom, Bulgaria, Greece and China. The bankruptcy estate was bought up by the German photovoltaic group RenerVest and the SolarMax brand was rebuilt in Germany.

Company profile 
Sputnik Engineering AG had been working in the field of solar energy since 1991 and is one of the pioneers for the industry that invented, among others, the first transformer-less inverter in 1994. The Company was founded in the Swiss city of Biel and concentrated on the development, production, and distribution of inverters for grid-connected PV systems. 
With its brand “SolarMax“, Sputnik Engineering is able to offer a suitable device for all applications: one-family houses, farms, and even solar plants producing several megawatts.

Company structure 
Sputnik Engineering AG, Biel/Bienne, Switzerland
Sputnik Engineering France S.A.R.L., Saint-Priest, France
Sputnik Engineering GmbH, Neuhausen auf den Fildern, Germany.
Sputnik Engineering Ibérica S.L.U., Madrid, Spain
Sputnik Engineering International AG, Biel/Bienne, Switzerland
Branch office Benelux, Brussels
Branch office Greece, Athens
Branch office Bulgaria, Sofia
Branch office United Kingdom, London
Sputnik Engineering Italia S.r.l., Giussano, Italy
Sputnik Engineering Trading Ltd., Shanghai, China

Products 
Sputnik Engineering produces string inverters and central inverters for all sizes of solar systems, from small systems for roofs to solar plants producing several megawatts. For small systems they offer string inverters from the S and P series of SolarMax with a nominal capacity from 2 to 5 kW and for medium-sized systems the MT series of SolarMax (8 to 15 kW). 
The central inverters Sputnik Engineering offers include the S series of SolarMax (20 to 35 kW), the TS series of SolarMax ( 50 to 300 kW), the TS-SV series of SolarMax (330 kW) and the power station (330 kW to 1.32 MW). Sputnik Engineering also develops accessories and solutions for data communication for the monitoring, planning, and control of photovoltaic systems.

History 
Sputnik Engineering AG was founded in 1991 as a spin-off to the engineering school in Biel, Switzerland, and introduced the first three-phase central inverter with fully digital controls and regulation to the market.
The next technical innovation was the development of the first transformer-less inverter.
In 2001, the subsidiary Sputnik Engineering GmbH was founded in Germany as a reaction to the considerable growth in demand for photovoltaic inverters. In 2006 the subsidiary in Spain was founded, 2007 the Italian subsidiary followed, 2008 France and 2011 China. Locations in Belgium, United Kingdom, Greece and Bulgaria were added successively.

Notes and references 

Electronics companies established in 1991
Solar energy companies
Swiss brands
Swiss companies established in 1991
Electronics companies disestablished in 2014
Swiss companies disestablished in 2014